Angela Similea (born 9 July 1946 in 1 Decembrie, Ilfov County, Kingdom of Romania) is a Romanian female pop star who was famous for Pop Music easy listening music during the 1980s.

The Golden Stag music festival 

In the 1970 edition of the Golden Stag Festival, that took place in Brașov, Similea came second, winning The Silver Stag.

References 

1946 births
Golden Stag
Living people
20th-century Romanian women singers
20th-century Romanian singers